The 2010 Senior League World Series took place from August 15–21 in Bangor, Maine, United States. San Nicolaas, Aruba defeated host Bangor, Maine in the championship game.

Teams

Results

Group A

Group B

Elimination Round

References

Senior League World Series
Senior League World Series
Senior League World Series
Baseball in Bangor, Maine
Baseball competitions in Maine